Hilltop Youth (No'ar HaGva'ot) are hardline, extremist religious-nationalist youth who establish outposts without an Israeli legal basis in the West Bank. The ideology of the Hilltop Youth, a derivation of Kahanism, includes the claim that the Palestinians are "raping the Holy Land", and must be expelled. According to Ami Pedahzur, their work in establishing illegal outposts was not simply the result of individual initiatives, this was "a myth cultivated by the Yesha Council", and, in fact, forms part of a wider multi-faceted settler strategy. The term "hilltop youth" is regarded by Daniel Byman as a misnomer, since the movement was founded mostly by married people in their mid-twenties.

Origins
On 16 November 1998, in what was viewed as a declaration intended to thwart peace talks, and in particular the implementation of his political rival Benjamin Netanyahu's Wye River agreement with the Palestinian National Authority, the then-Israeli Defense Minister Ariel Sharon urged settler youth to "grab the hilltops", adding, "Everyone that's there should move, should run, should grab more hills, expand the territory. Everything that's grabbed will be in our hands. Everything we don't grab will be in their hands."

People proceeded to heed his exhortation and outposts proliferated, in a practice often called "creating facts on the ground", but many would later feel betrayed by Sharon when the Israeli West Bank barrier he devised in 2005 cut off many of the illegal communities from the expanded Israel Sharon envisaged at that time.

The example of figures like Netanel Ozeri, who moved his family out of the safety of Kiryat Arba's perimeters to build an outpost, Hilltop 26, on nearby Palestinian land, was also important: Ozeri was later  shot dead by Palestinian gunmen.

Influences 
According to terrorism expert Ami Pedahzur, ideologically, Hilltop Youth espouse a Kahanist worldview, favouring "deportation, revenge, and annihilation of Gentiles that posed a threat to the people of Israel".

The youth are influenced by religious Zionist ideals, which include a dedication to building and farming the land, as well as devoting time to learning Torah. Many have studied in the Od Yosef Chai yeshiva under Rabbi Yitzchak Ginsburgh, who developed the metaphor comparing Israel to a "nut" which had to be cracked in order to allow the fruit, the people, out. In addition to basing their ideals on the teachings of prominent rabbis such as Avraham Yitzchak Kook and Rabbi Shmuel Tal, some regard Avri Ran as a spiritual leader, or "father", of the movement, though he does not see himself as such. The philosophy of some in the movement is expressed by a mixture of distrust of the Israeli government and a desire to re-establish the Ancient Kingdom of Israel.

About the groups
The Hilltop Youth are a "loosely organized, anarchy-minded group", of some several hundred youths around a hard core of scores of  violent activists often noted for establishing illegal/disputed outposts outside existing settlements. According to Danny Rubinstein they are  formed into private militias. Their numbers (2009) are estimated to be around 800, with approximately 5,000 others who share their ideological outlook. They completely dissociate themselves from Israeli institutions, and identify themselves with the Land of Israel. They settle on hilltops in areas densely crowded by Palestinians. Members linked to the group have been accused of engaging in Israeli settler violence, including vandalism of Palestinian schools and mosques, the rustling of sheep from Palestinian flocks and the extirpation of their centuries-old olive groves, or stealing their olive harvests. This last practice was endorsed by Rabbi Mordechai Eliyahu on a visit to a hilltop outpost, Havat Gilad, where he issued a rabbinical ruling that, "The ground on which the trees are planted is the inheritance of the Jewish people, and the fruit of the plantings was seeded by the goyim in land that is not theirs." They seize land not by any official method: they claim a hilltop by setting up an encampment, and then claim the land nearby, whether under Palestinian cultivation or not, or by uprooting Palestinian trees and shooting in the air if any Palestinian comes near to the new outpost.

Settlers have long been accused of carrying out what are called "price tag attacks", a term used for targeting Palestinian property in revenge for outposts demolished by the Israeli military, although no one as yet has actually been convicted of having been involved in such vandalism.

Many of the Hilltop Youth feel that the mainstream settler movement has lost its way, opting for cheap housing close to major cities, built by local Arab labor, with tall fences and no space between their homes. The Youth often engage in organic farming and shun Palestinian labor in favor of Hebrew labor. 2.5% of eggs consumed in Israel are calculated to be produced on the outposts run by the Hilltop Youth leader Avri Ran. 

The Hilltop Youth has been condemned in the past by figures within Israel's government, with Former Defense Minister Ehud Barak referring to the group as unacceptable "homemade terror, Jewish-made terror".

Notable exponents

Meir Ettinger (born 4 October 1991), the son of Tova Kahane (daughter of Meir Kahane) and Mordechai Ettinger, a rabbi at the Jerusalem yeshivot of Har Hamor and Ateret Cohanim. He previously resided at Ramat Migron outpost, and later the Givat Ronen outpost near Har Brakha, was subsequently deported, by administrative order, from the West Bank and Jerusalem, taking up residence with his family in Safed. He has attracted many followers and in addition to public speaking, he has published a blog at the pro-Hilltop Youth website "The Jewish Voice" (Hebrew: הקול היהודי). He was arrested for the "spy affair", when settler youths were accused of maintaining an "operation room" to monitor IDF movements and warn outpost settlers of impending evacuations. After violating his house arrest terms, he was held in jail until the end of his trial, in which he was convicted following a plea-bargain for conspiring to gather military intelligence and sentenced to time served, approximately 6 months.  In August 2015, following the arson at the Church of the Multiplication in June and the Duma arson attack, he was placed under administrative arrest for 6 months, which was extended by an additional 4 months. During his incarceration, he staged a hunger strike. In June 2016, following his release, he returned to reside in Safed, and is barred by administrative order from entering the West Bank, Jerusalem, and Yad Binyamin. In addition, he is forbidden, by administrative order, from contacting 92 people.

See also 
 Israeli outpost
 Price tag policy

References

External links
About Nati Ozeri
Interview with Avri Ran

Israeli–Palestinian conflict
Society of Israel
Jewish movements
Religious Zionism